Bevan Alexander Behn Wilson  (born December 19, 1958) is a Canadian former professional ice hockey defenceman who played nine seasons in the National Hockey League (NHL) for the Philadelphia Flyers and Chicago Black Hawks. He featured in the 1980 Stanley Cup Finals.

Playing career
As a youth, Wilson played in the 1971 Quebec International Pee-Wee Hockey Tournament with a minor ice hockey team from Toronto.

Wilson played his junior hockey in the OMJHL with the Ottawa 67's from 1975–1977, the Windsor Spitfires from 1976–1977, and the Kingston Canadians from 1977–1978.  In 163 career games, he produced 154 points (35 goals-119 assists), and in 14 playoff games, he registered 9 points (4G-5A).  Wilson also played part of the 1976–77 season with the Kalamazoo Wings of the IHL, getting nine points (2G-7A) in 13 games.  He was known for his both his end-to-end rushes and his penalty minutes in his junior career.  Wilson was selected by the Philadelphia Flyers in the first round, sixth overall in the 1978 NHL Entry Draft.

Wilson stepped right into the Flyers lineup in 1978–79, playing in all 80 games, getting 49 points (18G-31A), along with 197 PIM. Those marks set team rookie records for a defenceman. In five playoff games, he scored one goal.  In 1979–80, Wilson played in 61 games, earning 34 points (9G-25A) to go with 212 PIM.  In the 1980 playoffs, he got 13 points (4G-9A) in 19 games.  Wilson had his best season in 1980–81, getting 63 points (17G-46A) in 77 games, and a career high 237 PIM.  He added 12 points (2G-10A) in 12 playoff games.  Wilson's production slipped in 1981–82, getting 36 points (13G-23A) in 59 games, and five points (1G-4A) in four playoff games.  In 1982–83, he played in 62 games, getting 32 points (8G-24A), and had an assist in three playoff games.  On June 8, 1983, the Flyers traded Wilson to the Chicago Black Hawks for Doug Crossman and Chicago's second round pick in the 1984 NHL Entry Draft (Scott Mellanby).

Wilson appeared in 59 games in 1983–84, getting 32 points (10G-22A) with Chicago, then went pointless in four playoff games.  In 1984–85, he registered 33 points (10G-23A), and added nine points (4G-5A) in 15 playoff games.  Wilson had a very productive 1985–86 season, getting 51 points (13G-38A) in 69 games.  In two playoff games, Wilson had no points.  He missed the entire 1986–87 season due to a back injury, but came back in 1987–88 getting 29 points (6G-23A) in 58 games.  On October 3, 1988, the Vancouver Canucks claimed Wilson in the waiver draft, however he did not play in any games in the 1988–89 season due to his back injury.

Wilson would never play another game, as he retired after the 1988–89 season.

Career statistics

Awards
1981 All-Star Game

References

External links
 

1958 births
Canadian ice hockey defencemen
Chicago Blackhawks players
Ice hockey people from Toronto
Kalamazoo Wings (1974–2000) players
Kingston Canadians players
Living people
National Hockey League All-Stars
National Hockey League first-round draft picks
Ottawa 67's players
Philadelphia Flyers draft picks
Philadelphia Flyers players
Windsor Spitfires players